Henry Lee Logan (born March 14, 1946) was an American basketball player. Logan was a 6'0" guard.

Amateur
He played high school basketball at Stephens-Lee High School in Asheville, North Carolina.

After high school Logan became the first African-American collegiate athlete in the history of North Carolina and perhaps at any predominantly white institution in the southeastern United States when he enrolled at and played basketball for Western Carolina University.

The Western Carolina University Board of Trustees wrote that Logan was “the first African-American basketball player to be recruited by and play for a predominantly white institution in the Southeast".

At WCU Logan scored 60 points in a game against Atlantic Christian in 1967, and he holds the record for most points in a season (1,049), a career (3,290) and highest career points average (30.7).

Logan led the nation in scoring for the 1967–68 season, when he averaged 36.2 points a game.

Logan helped the United States take the gold medal in the 1967 Pan American Games.

Professional
Logan was drafted in the fourth round of the 1968 NBA Draft by the Seattle SuperSonics.  He was also drafted by the Oakland Oaks in the 1968 ABA Draft.

Logan played for the Oakland Oaks in the 1968-69 ABA season, when the Oaks won the 1969 ABA Championship.

Playing in 76 games, Logan scored 947 points for an average of 12.5 points per game.  He increased that to an average of 13.6 points per game during the playoffs.

During the 1969–1970 season Logan played for the ABA's Washington Caps.  He played in 32 games, scoring 311 points for an average of 9.7 points per game. 
  
Despite averaging 11.6 points per game throughout his professional career, his 1969–70 season with the Washington Caps was Logan's final full professional season. He did appear in one game, briefly, for the Virginia Squires during the 1971 ABA Playoffs, scoring one point on a free throw.

In 2000, the North Carolina Sports Hall of Fame inducted Logan as member of its 37th class.  Others in his induction class included Duke head basketball coach Mike Krzyzewski and Carolina Panthers owner Jerry Richardson.

References

1946 births
Living people
American men's basketball players
Basketball players at the 1967 Pan American Games
Basketball players from North Carolina
Oakland Oaks players
Pan American Games gold medalists for the United States
Pan American Games medalists in basketball
Point guards
Seattle SuperSonics draft picks
Shooting guards
Sportspeople from Asheville, North Carolina
Virginia Squires players
Washington Caps players
Western Carolina Catamounts men's basketball players
Medalists at the 1967 Pan American Games